Pål Farstad (born 1 April 1959) is a Norwegian politician for the Liberal Party. He was elected to the Parliament of Norway from Møre og Romsdal in 2013 where he is member of the Standing Committee on Business and Industry.

References 

Liberal Party (Norway) politicians
Members of the Storting
Møre og Romsdal politicians
1959 births
Living people
21st-century Norwegian politicians